The 1986 UCLA Bruins football team was an American football team that represented the University of California, Los Angeles during the 1986 NCAA Division I-A football season.  In their 11th year under head coach Terry Donahue, the Bruins compiled an 8–3–1 record (5–2–1 Pac-10), finished in a tie for second place in the Pacific-10 Conference, and were ranked #12 in the final AP Poll.  The Bruins went on to defeat BYU in the 1986 Freedom Bowl.  On November 1, 1986, UCLA's defense scored three touchdowns against Oregon State.

UCLA's offensive leaders in 1986 were quarterback Matt Stevens with 1,869 passing yards, running back Gaston Green with 1,405 rushing yards, and wide receiver Flipper Anderson with 675 receiving yards.

Schedule

Personnel

Rankings

Game summaries

at Oklahoma

USC

vs. BYU (Freedom Bowl)

References

UCLA
UCLA Bruins football seasons
Freedom Bowl champion seasons
UCLA Bruins football